Matt Riviera (born May 18, 1983), is a Semi-retired American professional wrestler and podcast host. He is formerly one half of the NWA World Tag Team Champions with Rob Conway as the tag team The Iron Empire.  He also has promoted wrestling events. In addition to the wrestling business, he has also appeared in movies and television shows.

Early life 
Matt Riviera was born on May 18, 1983 in Russellville, Arkansas. At the age of 12 after coming across a television program, WCW Worldwide, Matt began his love for professional wrestling after watching Dick Slater wrestle. Pro wrestling's blend of physicality and theatrics appealed to him and he soon became passionate about professional wrestling. After being told at the age of 15 that he was too young to legally being training as a professional wrestler, Riviera began doing everything he could to get his foot in the door of the wrestling business such as creating wrestling programs. This included writing articles and taking photographs. He also began his first foray into promoting professional wrestling events at the age of 17 after meeting his mentor, wrestling trainer and promoter Bill Ash. He began promoting wrestling events under the name of Global Pro Wrestling. Once he finally began to train to become a Professional wrestler, he discovered that the physicality it takes to be a pro wrestler might be too much for him. He quit wrestling school on three occasions. However, at age 21, Riviera stuck with wrestling as he trained for six months as well as attended wrestling school for four months. Matt Riviera also obtained a college degree in broadcast journalism, graduating from Harding University out of Searcy, Arkansas in 2006.

Professional wrestling career

Matt Riviera had his first professional wrestling match in 2001 for the Arkansas Association of Wrestling by teaming with Running Wolf to take on the team of Frank Thornton and "Big" Wes Jones. Matt would go on to wrestle for various promotions throughout Arkansas and expanded to many other states and promotions. While wrestling, he was still involved in promoting wrestling events, as well as beginning college. Riviera promoted Global Pro Wrestling, which after a name change, became Traditional Championship Wrestling. Traditional Championship Wrestling was able to secure a national cable deal in 2013 with Cox Sports Television that would allow people all over the country to see Riviera and other TCW stars perform weekly. After TCW folded in 2014, Matt would then move on to focus more on his own in-ring career.

In 2005, Matt Riviera won his first professional wrestling championship while competing for Arkansas Wrestling Entertainment (AWE) by winning the AWE International Heavyweight Championship. He won this title by winning a tournament, last defeating Frank Thornton.

In 2009, Matt Riviera further solidified his status as one of Arkansas' premier athletes when he won the Pro Wrestling Arkansas Heavyweight Championship. He would also go on to win the PWA Tag Team Championship the same year, with his partner Johnny Morton.

TCW is the promotion where Matt Riviera has wrestled, as well as promoted. Started as Global Pro Wrestling, it was renamed as Traditional Championship Wrestling in 2009. As a promoter, Riviera took a local wrestling show and expanded it to an hour long show that was available to watch throughout the United States. As a wrestler, Riviera has won the TCW Heavyweight Championship as well as multiple tag team championships with various partners such as Jeff Jett, as Reckage & Romance; with Tim Storm as the Natural State Connection; with Greg Anthony as The Empire; and with Jerry Lawler. However, as TCW folded, Riviera began to focus more on his in-ring career and less on promoting.

National Wrestling Alliance

Championship success
Matt Riviera has wrestled in multiple National Wrestling Alliance promotions including NWA Mid South, NWA IHWE-Texas (Iconic Heroes of Wrestling Excellence), NWA Lonestar, and NWA Universal. While wrestling for these NWA promotions, Riviera has also won several regional championships such as the IHWE Heavyweight championship, NWA Lonestar Tag Team championships with partner Greg Anthony, and twice holding the Western States Heritage title. He is also the current NWA Mid South Unified champion, a championship that was unified with the TCW Heavyweight title when Traditional Championship Wrestling folded in 2014.

The Iron Empire 
In 2015, Matt Riviera decided to team up with former WWE star as well as 2 time National Wrestling Alliance World Heavyweight Champion Rob Conway. The two would become known as "The Iron Empire" after Rob's moniker, "The Ironman" and The Empire, a stable of wrestlers led by Matt Riviera. On December 4, 2015, The Iron Empire captured the coveted NWA World Tag Team Championships from The Heatseakers at an NWA Mid South event in Robinsonville, Mississippi. The team would go on to face the top teams in the NWA and are the current champions.

Matt Riviera debuted for Diamond Stars Wrestling on September 25. In the main event, he along with Iron Empire tag team partner Rob Conway, successfully defended the NWA World Tag Team Championship in a two out of three falls match against Rob Terry and Masakatsu Funaki. In the first fall, Conway pinned Funaki under a mask after hitting The Erotic City (Chokeslam/Belly to back suplex combo). In the second fall, Conway submitted to Funaki via a rear naked choke. In the third fall, Riviera was disqualified after hitting Terry with a chair.

The Iron Empire lost the NWA World Tag Team Championship to Kazushi Miyamoto and Rob Terry in Tokyo, Japan on February 23, 2017.

Feud With Jerry “The King” Lawler 
On September 16, 2017 at CWA WrestleRaise III in Hot Springs, Arkansas, Matt Riviera interfered in the NWA Worlds Heavyweight Title match between NWA Worlds Heavyweight champion, Tim Storm and Jerry Lawler, subduing Lawler with an ether rag, and allowing Storm to pin Lawler to retain the title.

Matt Riviera and Jerry Lawler would face off in a match on May 17, 2018 at CWA WrestleRaise V in Hot Springs, Arkansas, with the stipulation that if Lawler lost, he would kiss Riviera’s foot and if Riviera lost, Lawler would get 5 minutes in the ring with Riviera’s manager, Boyd Bradford. Lawler’s son, Brian “Christopher” Lawler would be in his corner. The match ended in DQ after Lawler shot a fireball in Riviera’s face, causing Riviera to have to be rushed out of the arena before Lawler could kiss Riviera’s foot.

Their next encounter would be at MSW: Legends of Wrestling on June 23, in Harrison, Arkansas. With referee James Beard down, Riviera would hit Lawler with an object and pin Lawler. After the bell, James Beard discovered the object & reversed the decision in favor of Lawler.

At a USA Championship Wrestling event in Jackson, Tennessee on July 7, Matt Riviera and Boyd Bradford would present “Superstar” Bill Dundee with a briefcase containing $100,000 if Dundee would agree to retire from wrestling. Dundee would accept the metal briefcase & then nail Riviera & Bradford with it before taking off with the money. On the July 14 episode of USA Championship Wrestling, Dundee would appear for an interview with the briefcase, before being confronted by Riviera. Jerry Lawler came to the aide of Dundee. Lawler and Dundee would attack Riviera before cutting Riviera’s prized perm in the middle of the ring. This would lead to a televised match the next week on July 21 between Riviera and Lawler, which ended in a No Contest after interference from Dundee & “Dangerous” Doug Gilbert.

On January 5, 2019 at a USA Championship Wrestling event in Jackson, Tennessee, during a match between Lawler and “Wildfire” Tommy Rich, with the referee down & Lawler covering Rich, Riviera slid in the ring wearing a referee shirt, counted to 2 & stopped. Riviera then attacked Lawler, rolled Rich on top of Lawler and made the 3 count.

Riviera and Lawler would next meet on February 16 at USA Championship Wrestling’s Thunderdome event in Jackson, TN in a Thunderdome Cage Match. The match would see Jerry Lawler unintentionally throw a fireball into the face of one referee & Riviera pile drive another referee. “Wildfire” Tommy Rich, wearing a referee shirt attempted to take the key from outside official, Jerry Calhoun, before being stopped by “Dangerous” Doug Gilbert. Jerry Calhoun would eventually unlock the cage door & count the pin for Lawler.

On March 9 at USA Championship Wrestling’s “Hot Stuff” Eddie Gilbert Tribute Event in Jackson, Tennessee, a “Falls Count Anywhere in Madison County Match” took place, as Jerry Lawler and Doug Gilbert faced off against Matt Riviera & Tommy Rich. The match ended in a pinfall victory for Lawler & Gilbert after Gilbert pinned Tommy Rich.

On October 12 at CWA Lloyd’s Rumble in Hot Springs, Arkansas, Matt Riviera would become the CWA’s 1st Arkansas Heavyweight champion, winning the “Lloyd’s Rumble Battle Royal” by last eliminating Tim Storm. Riviera had also picked up a victory in a match against Buff Bagwell, earlier in the evening, after Arn Anderson interfered in the match by delivering a Spinebuster to Bagwell, allowing Riviera to get the pin fall.

On January 18, 2020, at CWA No Surrender in North Little Rock, Arkansas, Matt Riviera put his newly won Arkansas Heavyweight Title on the line against Jerry Lawler’s career in a “Title vs. Career Match”. Lawler would pick up the pin fall victory after throwing a massive fireball in Riviera’s face, making Lawler the new Arkansas Heavyweight champion.

At the Jerry Lawler 50th Anniversary Celebration at The Ballpark in Jackson, Tennessee on September 26, Jerry Lawler & The Rock N’ Roll Express (w/ Jimmy Hart) faced Matt Riviera, “Wildfire” Tommy Rich, & “Dangerous” Doug Gilbert (w/ Ron Ratcatcher) in a Thunderdome Cage Match. Lawler would pin Riviera for the victory after hitting Riviera with Jimmy Hart’s megaphone. Musical icon Kid Rock and golfer John Daly (golfer) were in attendance for the event.

Also during this period, Riviera was involved in angles & matches with Buff Bagwell, Bob Holly, Tony Atlas, & Tim Storm as well as various other wrestlers on the independent wrestling circuit.

Sheriff Buford Pusser Memorial Cup 
On May 24, 2018, at the 30th Annual Sheriff Buford Pusser Festival in Adamsville, Tennessee, Matt Riviera won the 1st Annual Sheriff Buford Pusser Memorial Cup, presented by Bert Prentice’s USA Championship Wrestling, in a battle royal by last eliminating “Superstar” Bill Dundee.

Retirement 
On January 1, 2021 Matt Riviera officially announced his retirement from professional wrestling. Riviera stated in a press release:

“I seriously appreciate the support that I have received for the duration of my time as an active talent and promoter in pro wrestling. It is time to open a new chapter in my life by closing this one. I wish everyone the best.”

Other media

Movies 
Besides professional wrestling, Matt Riviera has the passion for acting as well. He got his first chance to be featured in a movie in the 2009 thriller, Blood Forest. Riviera played a deputy in the film. In 2010, Riviera had a role in the drama, Step Away from the Stone. His latest appearance in a movie was in the 2011 thriller, Happy Hour.

Reality television 
It was after VH1 producers saw Matt Riviera's acting in Happy Hour, as well as his in-ring career that they invited him to become a participant on a new reality show, Megan Wants a Millionaire. The show's premise was that reality show contestant, Megan Hauserman would eliminate contestants, one by one until she chose the winner, whom she would marry. Matt Riviera was on the show as his net worth was 5.5 million dollars. The show would only go on to air three episodes due to controversy surrounding one of the contestants. Riviera would appear in all three aired episodes. In 2013, he would appear on the Bravo TV network show Millionaire Matchmaker, Season 6 appearing in the episode titled, The Dancer and the Wrestler.

Podcast 
On August 31, 2017, Matt Riviera launched "The Matt Riviera Show" Podcast.

Dave Palumbo WWE Wellness Policy Controversy 
Episode 5 of The Matt Riviera Show featured an interview with former bodybuilder, Dave Palumbo. Palumbo is a noted “nutritionist” to such WWE performers as Steve Austin, Triple H & Stephanie McMahon.

During the interview, Riviera asked Palumbo repeatedly about the types of “supplements” that Triple H was taking, inferring that Triple H may have been using steroids. Palumbo vehemently denied that Triple H was taking steroids, because it would be a violation of WWE’s Wellness Policy and went on to say that he was sure that Triple H would “love to” take steroids.  However, Palumbo went on to state that WWE wrestlers were allowed to take growth hormones, such as HGH, which are banned substances in all professional sports in the United States.

Palumbo Quote-

“But the good thing about wrestling is it’s not a professional sport per se, more entertainment, they are allowed to take hormone replacement. So they can go to HRT places, they can get testosterone, you know, 100 milligrams a week, whatever they prescribe nowadays, umm, they can get hCG, they can do, you know, hGH if they want. Those are acceptable, you know, and a lot of the wrestlers do do it, y’know, it’s not for me to say who’s using what, but they’re very minimal doses.”

This quote would cause the WWE to release a press statement attempting to clarify their Wellness Policy guidelines on growth hormone use:

“WWE’s comprehensive Talent Wellness Policy, which is administered by an independent, third-party, clearly states hGH and hCG are among a long list of banned substances, however, due to certain medical conditions, there are a variety of therapeutic exemptions that account for approximately 7% of our contracted talent.”

The story was picked up by numerous websites, including Forbes.com, Deadspin.com, & BleacherReport.com

Music 
On February 14, 2018, Matt Riviera made his hip hop music debut, releasing the song and music video for “Best Meat’s in the Rump (Juicy)”, a collaboration with DJ Mr. Mixx of controversial rap group, 2 Live Crew, & pro wrestling manager, Boyd Bradford. The song was released for iTunes, Google Play, Amazon, and multiple other music streaming services. The song features shout outs to WWE women wrestlers Ronda Rousey, Nikki Bella, Alexa Bliss, and Nia Jax.

Weight Lifting 
Riviera is an avid gym goer boasting a bench press of 445 lbs. for 1 rep, 225 lbs. for 40 reps, and 380 lbs. for 3 reps in 2022. His best recorded deadlift is 520 lbs. His coach is Warren Martin owner of Sync Fitness in Conway, AR.

Championships and accomplishments 
 Arkansas Wrestling Entertainment
 AWE International Heavyweight Championship (1 time)
 Championship Wrestling Of Arkansas
 Arkansas Heavyweight Champion (1 Time)
CWA Arkansas Heavyweight Championship (1 time) 
 Cauliflower Alley Club
 Men's Wrestling Award (2013)
 Insane Hardcore Wrestling Excellence
 IHWE Heavyweight Championship (1 time)
National Wrestling Alliance
NWA World Tag Team Championship (3 times) – with Rob Conway
  NWA Elite Championship Wrestling
  NWA ECW Tag Team Championship (2 times) – with Greg Anthony (1) and Tim Storm (1)
 NWA Lonestar
 NWA Lonestar Tag Team Championships (2 times) – with Greg Anthony
 NWA Mid South
NWA Mid-South Unified Heavyweight Championship (1 time)
 NWA Western States Heritage Championship (2 times)
 Pro Wrestling Arkansas
 PWA Heavyweight Championship
 PWA Tag Team Championship – with Johnny Morton
Pro Wrestling Illustrated
Ranked No. 146 of the top 500 singles wrestlers in the PWI 500 in 2016
 Traditional Championship Wrestling
 TCW Heavyweight Championship (1 time)
 TCW Tag Team Championships, (5 times) – with Jeff Jett, Tim Storm, Greg Anthony, and Jerry Lawler
USA Championship Wrestling
1st Annual Buford Pusser Memorial Cup Champion (1 time)

References

External links
 
 

1983 births
21st-century American male actors
American male television actors
Participants in American reality television series
Living people
People from Pope County, Arkansas
Harding University alumni
NWA World Tag Team Champions